The 1984 UMass Minutemen football team represented the University of Massachusetts Amherst in the 1984 NCAA Division I-AA football season as a member of the Yankee Conference. The team was coached by Bob Stull and played its home games at Warren McGuirk Alumni Stadium in Hadley, Massachusetts. The stadium had been called Alumni Stadium from its opening in 1965 until the November 3, 1984, game against Connecticut, when it was officially named for Warren McGuirk, who was the UMass Athletic Director from 1948 to 1972. UMass finished the season with a record of 3–8 overall and 1–4 in conference play.

Schedule

References

UMass
UMass Minutemen football seasons
UMass Minutemen football